Anwara Khatun was a Bengali politician and member of provincial assembly.

Early  life 
Khatun was born in 1925 in Mirpur Model Thana, Dhaka, East Bengal, British Raj. She was married off when she was six years old. She completed a bachelors in law and another in technology after which she completed her Masters in Art.

Career 
Khatun was elected to the Bengal Legislative Assembly in 1946. She had hosted Huseyn Shaheed Suhrawardy at her house when he came to Dhaka in 1948. She was invited to join the Shorbodolio Rashtrabhasha Shangram Parishad by Kazi Golam Mahbub. She was an activist of the Bengali language movement. She spoke in the assembly against the death of students protesting for making Bengali a state language of Pakistan in police action. She was expelled from the Muslim League. She attended the conference in Rose Garden which led to the creation of Awami League.

Khatun was re-elected to the East Bengal Provincial Assembly in 1954 as a candidate of the United Front.

Khatun led the Awami League in 1966 when the male leadership party was imprisoned.

Personal life 
Khatun's husband, Ali Amzad Khan, was a founder of the Awami League.

Death 
Khatun died in 1988.

References 

1925 births
1988 deaths
People from Dhaka
Politicians from Dhaka
Awami League politicians
20th-century Bangladeshi women politicians